Sofie Marhaug (born 24 May 1990) is a Norwegian politician.

She was elected representative to the Storting from the constituency of Hordaland for the period 2021–2025, for the Red Party.

In the Storting, she is a member of the Standing Committee on Energy and the Environment 2021–2025.

References

1990 births
Living people
Red Party (Norway) politicians
Hordaland politicians
Members of the Storting
Women members of the Storting